|- style="vertical-align: top;"
| Distance 
| 39,000 Ly 

XTE J1739−285 is a neutron star,  in the constellation Ophiuchus, situated approximately 39,000 light-years from Earth. It was first observed on 19 October 1999 by NASA's
Rossi X-ray Timing Explorer satellite.

It had previously been claimed that XTE J1739−285 was the fastest-spinning celestial body yet known, with a frequency of 1122 Hz. However, a re-analysis of these data by other astronomers has been unable to reproduce this result.

XTE J1739−285 has been proposed as a possible quark star, as well as 3C 58.

References

Ophiuchus (constellation)
Neutron stars